Countryside   is a subdivision of Åland and one of the Sub-regions of Finland since 2009.

Municipalities
 Eckerö
 Finström
 Geta
 Hammarland
 Jomala
 Lemland
 Lumparland
 Saltvik
 Sund

Sub-regions of Finland
Geography of Åland